The Taipei Times is the only printed daily English-language newspaper in Taiwan, and the third established there. Online competitors include the state-owned Focus Taiwan and Taiwan News; The China Post was formerly a competitor but is no longer operational. Established on 15 June 1999, the Taipei Times is published by the Liberty Times Group, which also publishes a Chinese-language newspaper, the Liberty Times, Taiwan's biggest newspaper by circulation, with a pro–Taiwan independence editorial line.

With English-language competitors Taiwan News and The China Post ceasing print publication in 2010 and 2017 respectively, the Taipei Times is consequently offered at most points of sale, hotels and libraries as the sole local English-language newspaper.

It is a participant in Project Syndicate.

See also
 
 
 Media of Taiwan

References

External links 
 

1999 establishments in Taiwan
English-language newspapers published in Taiwan
Mass media in Taipei
Publications established in 1999